The white-tailed titi monkey (Plecturocebus discolor) is a species of titi monkey, a type of New World monkey, from South America. It is found in Colombia, Ecuador and Peru. It was described in 1848 as Callithrix discolor.

References

white-tailed titi
Mammals of Peru
Mammals of Ecuador
Mammals of Colombia
white-tailed titi
white-tailed titi
Taxa named by Isidore Geoffroy Saint-Hilaire